Hedden County Park is a general purpose public park, located in Morris County, New Jersey, near the town of Dover. The park was dedicated on October 4, 1970, and is named after the Hedden family of Dover, who donated the original  section in 1963.

The park features two ball fields, and other multiple-purpose fields, and a children play area. There are picnic areas, including a 140-person sheltered area with facilities. The pond offers a fishing deck. Most of the park area is accessible from several hiking trails through woods and along streams and waterfalls.

References

External links
  Hedden Park Trail map

Dover, New Jersey
Parks in Morris County, New Jersey
County parks in New Jersey